Emily Anderson, OBE (March 1891 – October 1962) was an Irish scholar of German and a music historian who worked in the British Foreign Office during WWII.

She was born in Galway, Ireland, the daughter of physicist Alexander Anderson, a Presbyterian from Coleraine. Anderson became president of Queens College Galway in 1899.

She was educated privately and won the Browne Scholarship in 1909 at QCG, where she received a B.A. in 1911.She displayed a strong interest in the suffragette movement in Galway. After further study in Berlin and Marburg, she taught for two years at Queen's College, Barbados. She then returned in 1917 to Galway where she was appointed the first professor of German at University College Galway.

Anderson resigned from her position in 1920. She moved to London and immediately joined the Foreign Office. In 1923 she published a translation of Benedetto Croce's book on Goethe. Between 1940 and 1943 she was seconded to the War Office; she later received the OBE for Intelligence resulting from work she carried out in the Middle East. She retired from the foreign office in 1951.

Anderson published the Letters of Mozart and his family, which she herself edited and translated. Her Letters of Beethoven were published in 1961. The Federal Republic of Germany awarded her the Order Of Merit first class for her work on Beethoven.

She died at Hampstead, London in October 1962. Whilst lodging with the family of Patricia Bartley, Anderson recruited her to work at the Government Code and Cypher School (the forerunner of GCHQ). 

The Royal Philharmonic Society awards the Annual Emily Anderson Prize to young violinists in Anderson's honour.

NUI Galway has named their concert hall the Emily Anderson Concert Hall in her memory. Music for Galway, in conjunction with NUI Galway, holds an annual concert in her honour.

See also

 Florence Moon
 Mary Donovan O'Sullivan

Sources
Obituary, The Times, Monday, 29 October 1962; pg. 12; Issue 55534; col F
On the "Western Outpost":Local Government and Women's Suffrage in County Galway, 1898-1918, Mary Clancy, pp. 557–587, in "Galway:History and Society", 1996
Translated Penguin Book - at  Penguin First Editions reference site of early first edition Penguin Books.

References

1891 births
1962 deaths
Academics of the University of Galway
Civil servants in the War Office
Civil servants in the Foreign Office
People from Galway (city)
People from County Galway
Officers of the Order of the British Empire
Officers Crosses of the Order of Merit of the Federal Republic of Germany
British women biographers
British biographers
Beethoven scholars
Mozart scholars